Manuel "Manny" Bamba Villar Jr. (born December 13, 1949) is a Filipino
businessman and former politician. He previously served as senator from 2001 to 2013 and as the President of the Senate of the Philippines from 2006 to 2008. Before his stint in the senate, he represented the district of Las Piñas–Muntinlupa from 1992 to 1998, and Las Piñas's at-large district from 1998 to 2001. He also became the speaker of the House of Representatives from 1998 to 2000; in this term, he presided over the impeachment of President Joseph Estrada. From 2019 to 2022, Forbes magazine named Villar as the richest individual in the Philippines, with an estimated net worth of $8.3 billion.

Villar was born to a poor family in Tondo, an impoverished and densely populated district of Manila. After graduating from the University of the Philippines, he worked as an accountant and financial analyst, then launched a highly successful business in real estate. Villar's companies have built over 200,000 homes, and his business career made him the wealthiest person in the Philippines.

He ran for president in the 2010 presidential elections under the Nacionalista Party, but lost to Benigno Aquino III.

Early life and education
Manuel Villar was born on December 13, 1949, in Tondo, an impoverished and densely populated district of Manila. He was the second-born of the nine children of his parents in a poor family. His father, Manuel "Maning" Montalban Villar Sr., was a government employee from Cabatuan, Iloilo who worked as an inspector for the Bureau of Fisheries. His mother, Curita "Curing" Bamba, was a seafood vendor from a poor family in Orani, Bataan. The family lived in a small rented apartment in a run down slum area. Villar's father was eventually granted a year-long scholarship for higher education in the United States, which led to a job promotion to a director position in the Department of Agriculture and Natural Resources upon his return. Due to cramped conditions in Tondo, Villar's father obtained a ₱16,000 loan from the Government Service Insurance System, payable in 20 to 25 years, to build a home in San Rafael Village, Navotas.
As a child, Villar initially attended Isabelo delos Reyes Elementary School, a nearby public school in Tondo. He also assisted his mother in selling shrimp and fish at the Divisoria Public Market, as early as age six, in order to help earn the money to support his siblings and himself to school. However, accompanying his mother interfered with his education and he was forced to drop out from school during Grade 1. He was then enrolled at Tondo Parochial School (later renamed Holy Child Catholic School), a private school in Tondo run by priests, to complete his elementary education.

Villar finished his high school education at the Mapúa Institute of Technology in Santa Cruz, adjacent to Tondo. He attended the University of the Philippines Diliman and earned his bachelor's degree in business administration in 1970. He returned to the same school to earn his master's degree in business administration in 1973. He later characterized himself as being impatient with formal schooling, and eager to start working and go into business.

Business career
After obtaining his bachelor's degree, Villar began his professional career working as an accountant for Sycip, Gorres, Velayo & Co. (SGV & Co). He resigned from SGV & Co. to start his first business, delivering seafood in Makati. However, when his largest customer was unable to pay him, he negotiated a debt restructuring of sorts, selling discounted meal tickets to office workers in exchange for receivables. He then worked briefly as a financial analyst for the Private Development Corporation of the Philippines, where his job was to sell World Bank loans. Wanting to start a business of his own again, he quit his job and availed of one of the loans, which offered attractive rates.

In 1975, with an initial capital of ₱10,000, Villar purchased two reconditioned trucks and started a business delivering sand and gravel for construction companies in Las Piñas. This eventually segued into building houses, as Villar took out a seven-year loan from a rural bank offering low interest rates. He initiated mass housing projects through economies of scale, utilizing the cost advantages of developing a large-scale project in order to bring down housing prices. The number of homes built by Villar's companies totaled to over 200,000 units.

In the 1980s, Villar established Prime Water to operate and maintain water distribution systems throughout the country. It counts a 25-year partnership with the municipality of Daraga to deliver bulk water, a 25-year joint venture agreement with Lingayen Water District in Pangasinan, and a 25-year joint agreement with the Leyte Metropolitan Water District among its 30 water projects with local water districts. The Commission on Audit flagged Prime Water's operations in Guagua, Pampanga due to high levels of arsenic in the commission's 2018 annual report. The company produces over 170 million liters of treated water daily, supplied by more than 250 deep wells and surface water resources, and is directly involved in delivering water to more than 150,000 households across the Philippines. Now under the Villar Group of Companies, the water utility firm is led by their eldest son, Paolo.

In 1984, he founded Golden Haven Memorial Park, a chain of cemeteries in the Philippines, started with its first branch in Las Piñas and expanded in Cebu, Cagayan de Oro, Zamboanga, Bulacan, and Iloilo. It will also expanded into the businesses of memorial chapel, crematorium and columbarium.

In July 1995, Villar's flagship property, C&P Homes, was listed on the Philippine Stock Exchange and grew by more than a third in one day, ballooning Villar's 80% stake in the company to $1.5 billion.

Vista Land and Lifescapes Inc, a family-owned business of Villar, is also listed in the privately owned Philippine Stock Exchange. Their shares of stocks were bought primarily by foreign funds which had given the government, as well as the PSE, good revenues.

Villar has received several awards for his achievements during his professional and business career, including being one of the Ten Outstanding Young Men in 1986, the Agora Award for Marketing Management in 1989, Most Outstanding CPA by the Institute of Certified Public Accountants in 1990, and Most Outstanding UP Alumnus in 1991. In 2004, he was named the Most Distinguished Alumnus, the highest recognition given by the University of the Philippines Alumni Association.

In a report of International Consortium of Investigative Journalists on offshore leaks in April 2013, Villar was listed among the businessmen with offshore accounts. It was revealed that Villar owned an account in the British Virgin Islands.

In 2015, the MB Villar Group formed another company, Vitacare Healthgroup, Inc., a group that will build chain of hospitals nationwide. Its first project Vitacare Unimed Hospital & Medical Center (in partnership with Unimed) will be located in Vista City, Las Piñas will be fully operated in 2018.

As of September 2018, Forbes magazine ranks him as the 2nd-wealthiest person in the Philippines, with his net worth of US$5 billion or ₱269 billion. However, his statements of assets and liabilities (SALN) filed for the year 2012 states his net worth at P1.453 billion.

In 2019, Forbes magazine named Villar as the new richest individual in the Philippines, with an estimated net worth of $5.5 billion, surpassing Henry Sy Sr. In 2021, his net worth surged to approximately $6.7 billion despite being overtaken by the Sy siblings in Forbes' annual Philippines rich list.

Political career

House of Representatives
Villar entered politics when he was elected as the representative of Las Piñas-Muntinlupa's at-large district in 1992. At 42 years old, he was one of the youngest members of the House of Representatives. Early in his congressional career, Villar was a prolific filer of House bills; in the first 100 days of the Ninth Congress, Villar filed the most number of local bills in the House of Representatives. Due to congressional redistricting, he later represented the district of Las Piñas.

Villar became the speaker of the House of Representatives in 1998, during his third term in congress. As speaker, he presided over the impeachment of President Joseph Estrada over corruption allegations in November 2000. Along with a large group of lawmakers which include the Senate president, Villar defected from Estrada's Laban ng Makabayang Masang Pilipino (LAMMP) coalition in order to hasten the process of impeachment. However, he was ousted as speaker by Estrada's allies, replacing him with Camarines Sur representative Arnulfo Fuentebella.

Senate
Villar ran and won a seat as a senator in the 2001 elections. He ran as an independent candidate, but campaigned as a member of the People Power Coalition. He was later reelected in 2007, running as a member of the Genuine Opposition coalition.

In July 2006, Villar became the Senate president, making him the first post-World War II public official to head both the House of Representatives and the Senate.

In November 2008, due to issues regarding the construction of a road extension in C5, Villar lost support and resigned as president of the Senate. His successor, Juan Ponce Enrile, launched an inquiry regarding the project.

2010 presidential campaign

Villar ran in the 2010 presidential election under the Nacionalista Party, with Senator Loren Legarda as his running mate.

During the campaign, columnist William Esposo claimed that Villar lied in his television commercials and could not have been poor because his younger brother was admitted to FEU Hospital, which he claims was a top hospital at the time and, in 1962, there was no bone marrow transplantation and chemotherapy in the country yet. Villar clarified that his brother was admitted as a charity patient because the family was unable to afford treatment.

Villar lost the election to Benigno Aquino III after placing third with 5,573,835 votes.

Personal life
As a junior at the University of the Philippines Diliman, Villar became friends with Cynthia Aguilar, his classmate at the UP College of Business Administration. They married at age 25. They have three children: Manuel Paolo, Mark, and Camille.

See also
"Naging Mahirap", Villar's jingle for his 2010 presidential campaign

References

External links
Official website of Senator Manny Villar
Senate of the Philippines - Senator Manny Villar
I-site.ph - Senator Manny Villar

1949 births
Living people
Businesspeople from Metro Manila
Candidates in the 2010 Philippine presidential election
Filipino billionaires
Filipino businesspeople in real estate
Filipino company founders
Filipino Roman Catholics
Independent politicians in the Philippines
Lakas–CMD politicians
Members of the House of Representatives of the Philippines from Las Piñas
Nacionalista Party politicians
People from Las Piñas
People from Manila
People from Tondo, Manila
Presidents of the Nacionalista Party
Presidents of the Senate of the Philippines
Presidents pro tempore of the Senate of the Philippines
Pwersa ng Masang Pilipino politicians
Senators of the 12th Congress of the Philippines
Senators of the 13th Congress of the Philippines
Senators of the 14th Congress of the Philippines
Senators of the 15th Congress of the Philippines
Speakers of the House of Representatives of the Philippines
University of the Philippines Diliman alumni
Visayan people